Michelle Marie Harrison (born 21 December 1979) is a British writer whose debut novel, The Thirteen Treasures, won the Waterstone's Children's Book Prize and has been sold for translation in 17 countries. The 13 Treasures is the first part of a trilogy, which has continued with The 13 Curses and The 13 Secrets. Her fourth novel and first book for young adults is Unrest, a ghost story published by Simon & Schuster in 2012.

Biography 
Harrison was born and raised in Grays, Essex, England.  After studying illustration at Staffordshire University, Harrison worked as a barmaid, in an art gallery, as a children's bookseller, and as an assistant editor for a children's book publisher. She now writes full-time and lives in Oxfordshire.

Works and appearances

Bibliography

13 Treasures series
 The Thirteen Treasures (2009)
 The Thirteen Curses (2010)
 The Thirteen Secrets (2011) 
 One Wish (2014)

A Pinch of Magic series

 A Pinch of Magic (2019)
 A Sprinkle of Sorcery (2020)
 A Tangle of Spells (2021)

Other novels
 Unrest (2012)
 The Other Alice (2016)

Anthologies
 Winter Magic (2017)

References

External links 
 
 Biography and video conversation about Unrest at publisher Simon & Schuster
 
 

1979 births
English children's writers
English fantasy writers
Ghost story writers
People from Grays, Essex
Living people
British women children's writers
21st-century English novelists
21st-century British women writers
Women science fiction and fantasy writers
Alumni of Staffordshire University